Nanshan District is a district of the city of Hegang, Heilongjiang province, China.

Administrative divisions 
Nanshan District is divided into 6 subdistricts. 
6 subdistricts
 Tiexi, Tiedong, Liuhao, Dalu, Fuli, Lulinshan

References 

Nanshan